A kangaroo pocket is a type of pocket, usually featured on hoodies and sweatshirts, that is large enough to fit both hands into. The pocket is open on either side. Other names for it include muff pocket and hoodie pocket.

The pocket sits on the lower front section of the shirt. It is usually large enough to contain some personal belongings. The kangaroo pocket is most associated with casual clothing such as the hoodie or sweatshirt.

Origin 
Kangaroo pockets were created in the 1930s as a hand warmer to be put on sweatshirts. Their functionality changed as people used them to hold phones, wallets, and other personal belongings. That caused them to become very popular with skateboarders and college students as they easily forget where they place their things.

References

Sweaters
Hip hop fashion
Punk fashion